Blue and Gold may refer to:
 Blue & Gold, the school newspaper of Taipei American School
 "Navy Blue and Gold", the alma mater of the United States Naval Academy
 Nocturne: Blue and Gold – Old Battersea Bridge, an 1870s painting
 An Annapolis Story, alternatively known as The Blue and Gold, a 1955 American war/drama film
 Winnipeg Blue Bombers, a football team in the Canadian Football League

See also
 "The Blue and the Gold March", the official fight song of the University of Negros Occidental-Recoletos
 Blue & Gold Fleet an American ferry company
 Blue Gold (disambiguation)
 The dress, a viral internet phenomenon over whether a dress was black and blue or white and gold.